Tyrone Goard (born April 30, 1989) is an American football wide receiver who is currently a free agent. He was signed as an undrafted free agent by the Cincinnati Bengals in 2013. He played college football at Eastern Kentucky. He has also spent time with the Pittsburgh Power, Portland Thunder, Philadelphia Soul, Winnipeg Blue Bombers, Los Angeles KISS, Portland Steel and Tampa Bay Storm.

Early years
He attended Capital High School in Charleston, West Virginia. He was selected to the second team all-state at the Division 3A level. He had 53 receptions for 879 receiving yards and nine receiving touchdowns in his senior season of high school.

College career
He played college football at Eastern Kentucky University. He was selected to the 2011 All-OVC second team.

Professional career

2013 NFL Combine

Cincinnati Bengals
On April 27, 2013, he signed with the Cincinnati Bengals as an undrafted free agent following the 2013 NFL Draft. On August 18, 2013, he was released by the Bengals.

Pittsburgh Power
On October 12, 2013, Goard was assigned to the Pittsburgh Power of the Arena Football League (AFL). Goard made his Arena Football League debut against the Cleveland Gladiators on March 15, 2014.

Portland Thunder
On March 26, 2014, Goard was traded to the Portland Thunder in exchange for offensive lineman Antonio Narcisse. Goard did not appear in any games with the Thunder.

Pittsburgh Power (II)
On April 3, 2014, Goard was traded back to the Power in exchange for wide receiver Alvance Robinson. On April 11, Goard caught 2 passes for 15 yards and 2 touchdowns against the New Orleans VooDoo. Goard played extremely well upon his return to the Power, catching 29 passes for 306 yards and 18 touchdowns in only 7 games. Goard was placed on injured reserve for the team's final 5 regular season games but was activated on July 31, three days before the Power's playoff game against the Orlando Predators. The Power folded after the 2014 season.

Philadelphia Soul
On December 29, 2014, Goard was assigned to the Philadelphia Soul.

Winnipeg Blue Bombers
After one season in the AFL, Goard signed with the Winnipeg Blue Bombers of the Canadian Football League on February 23, 2015. On May 15, 2015, Goard was released.

Los Angeles KISS
On June 5, 2015, the Soul traded Goard to the Los Angeles KISS for future considerations. On November 20, 2015, Goard was assigned to the KISS. On March 26, 2016, Goard was placed on recallable reassignment.

Portland Steel
On April 13, 2016, Goard was assigned to the Portland Steel.

Tampa Bay Storm
Goard was assigned to the Tampa Bay Storm on February 15, 2017. He was placed on On injury reserved by the Storm on March 20, 2017.

References

External links
 Eastern Kentucky bio 
 Cincinnati Bengals bio

1989 births
American football wide receivers
Living people
Eastern Kentucky Colonels football players
Players of American football from West Virginia
Sportspeople from Charleston, West Virginia
Cincinnati Bengals players
Pittsburgh Power players
Portland Thunder players
Philadelphia Soul players
Los Angeles Kiss players
Portland Steel players
Tampa Bay Storm players